North Harbor Tower is a 556 ft (169m) tall skyscraper in Chicago, Illinois, US. It was completed in 1988 and has 55 floors. Fujikawa Johnson & Associates designed the building, which is the 53rd tallest in Chicago. Each window in the building has a triangular projection to take advantage of skyline, park, lake, and river views. As with many apartment buildings in the area, North Harbor Tower boasts several amenities such as an indoor pool, several door attendants, a 24-hour fitness center, and an outdoor sundeck.

In January 2016, Crescent Heights agreed to purchase the 600-apartment building for an estimated $200 million.

In June 2018, Waterton Property Management & Investment Group agreed to purchase the building for an undisclosed amount.

Position in Chicago's skyline
North Harbor Tower appears immediately to the left of Harbor Point in the panorama below.

See also
List of tallest buildings in Chicago

References

External links
Emporis
Skyscraperpage

Residential skyscrapers in Chicago
Residential condominiums in Chicago
Lakeshore East
Residential buildings completed in 1988
1988 establishments in Illinois